Yeah! is an album by American saxophonist Charlie Rouse recorded in 1960 and released on the Epic label.

Reception

Steve Leggett in his review for AllMusic states: "Rouse headed up few sessions on his own as a bandleader, but as this calm, workmanlike set, recorded in 1960 and originally released in 1961 on Epic Records, clearly shows, he could rise to the occasion".

Track listing
All compositions by Charlie Rouse except as indicated
 "You Don't Know What Love Is" (Don Raye, Gene de Paul) - 6:31
 "Lil Rousin'" - 5:05
 "Stella by Starlight" (Victor Young, Ned Washington) - 6:21
 "Billy's Blues" - 8:46
 "Rouse's Point" - 4:47
 "(There Is) No Greater Love" (Isham Jones, Marty Symes) - 6:22

Personnel
Charlie Rouse - tenor saxophone
Billy Gardner - piano
Peck Morrison - bass
Dave Bailey - drums

References

Epic Records albums
Charlie Rouse albums
1961 albums